Ringarooma is a small town in north-eastern Tasmania. The area around Ringarooma is known for Dairy farming and timber harvesting.
The locality is in the Dorset Council LGA, except for about 2.5% which is in the Break O'Day Council area.

History
The district was opened up to farming in the 1860s, and the town itself was founded in 1882 when a rural property was subdivided into lots by landowner Christopher Krushka. It was initially known as Krushka Town before being renamed Ringarooma in November 1888, taking on the name of a coastal town near Bridport, which was renamed Boobyalla. Ringarooma is believed to be an Aboriginal word meaning happy hunting ground.

Ringarooma Post Office opened on 1 October 1874.

In 2017 it was named the Legendary Capital of Tasmania.

Samuel Hawkes
First Member of the Tasmanian House of Assembly for Ringarooma
In office
26 July 1886 – December 1893
Preceded by
New seat
Succeeded by
William McWilliams
Personal details
Born
27 September 1845
Witham, Essex
Died
16 February 1937 (aged 91)
Scottsdale, Tasmania

Present day
Today, Ringarooma is a small town surrounded by dairy farming and timber harvesting country near mountains such as Mount Victoria and Ben Lomond.

Notable people
Bartlett Adamson, journalist, poet, author and political activist (1884–1951), (born here)
Alfred Gaby, recipient of the Victoria Cross (1892–1918), (born at Springfield near here)
Alan Lindsay Wardlaw, pastoralist, soldier and parliamentarian, managed a farm nearby.

Samuel Hawkes (27 September 1845 – 16 February 1937) was an Australian politician.

Samuel Hawkes
Member of the Tasmanian House of Assembly for Ringarooma
In office
26 July 1886 – December 1893
Preceded by
New seat
Succeeded by
William McWilliams
Personal details
Born
27 September 1845
Witham, Essex
Died
16 February 1937 (aged 91)
Scottsdale, Tasmania

References

Further reading
Tasmania's North-East: A Comprehensive History (No. 13): Ringarooma,Hon. A. W. Loone in The Examiner (14 Jan 1928)

External links

Australian Bureau of Statistics 2011 Census Quickstats of Ringarooma area
Find a Grave listing of Ringarooma General Cemetery

 
Towns in Tasmania
North East Tasmania
1882 establishments in Australia
Localities of Dorset Council (Australia)